Linsburg is a railway station located in Linsburg, Germany. The station is located on the Bremen–Hanover railway. The train services are operated by Deutsche Bahn as part of the Hanover S-Bahn. Linsburg is served by the S2. It is in the Außenraum zone of Hannover.

Train services
The following services currently call at Linsburg:

External links
For information see www.gvh.de

Railway stations in Lower Saxony
Hannover S-Bahn stations